The variegated bristle tyrant (Pogonotriccus poecilotis) is a species of passerine bird in the family Tyrannidae. It is found in Colombia, Ecuador, Peru, and Venezuela. This species is sometimes placed in the genus Phylloscartes.

Its natural habitat is subtropical or tropical moist montane forests.

References

variegated bristle tyrant
Birds of the Northern Andes
variegated bristle tyrant
variegated bristle tyrant]
Taxonomy articles created by Polbot